Saša Bošković (born 11 June 1963) is a Serbian handball coach for the Serbian women's national team.

References

1963 births
Living people
Serbian handball coaches